The Hippopotamus Pool is the eighth in a series of historical mystery novels, written by Elizabeth Peters and featuring fictional sleuth and archaeologist Amelia Peabody.

Explanation of the novel's title
The title of the book comes from an ancient Egyptian tale about warring princes Apophis and Sekenenre, wherein Apophis sends Sekenenre a message: "The roaring of the hippopotami in your pools prevents me from sleeping! Hunt them and kill them, that I may rest." There are also several references to the goddess Taueret, who is represented as a hippo.

As Amelia tries to untie the mystery of who is doing what to whom, she and Evelyn begin to refer to Riccetti's group as the "Hippopotamus Gang".

Plot summary

Amelia and Emerson are in Cairo to greet the 20th century, when a mysterious Mr. Shelmadine presents them with a gold ring from an unknown tomb bearing the cartouche of Queen Tetisheri. The Emersons must defend against criminals and tomb robbers. This time, Amelia is up against two unknown parties, one to save, one to avenge.

This book also introduces David Todros, Ramses's lifelong friend and partner in adventures. Evelyn and Walter Emerson come back to the land of the pharaohs for the first time since their romance in the ruins of the heretical pharaoh's city, Amarna.

See also

List of characters in the Amelia Peabody series

Notes

Probably Sekenenra Tao II, known as Tao II the Brave, son of Tetisheri.
Probably Aawoserra Apopi of the Hyksos.

References

Amelia Peabody
1996 novels
Novels set in Egypt
Historical mystery novels